Garfield Township is a township in 
Lyon County, Iowa, USA.

References

Lyon County, Iowa
Townships in Iowa